The 2014 IAAF World Indoor Championships in Athletics was the fifteenth edition of the international indoor track and field competition, organised by the IAAF. The event was held between 7–9 March 2014 at the Ergo Arena in Sopot, Poland.

Preparation

Host bidding
The IAAF announced on 1 September 2011 that it had received bids from Poland and Croatia to host the championships. Later Zagreb, Croatia withdrew due to lack of funding. On 11 November 2011 at a Council meeting in Monaco, the IAAF announced that Sopot, as the only remaining bidder, would host the championships. Budapest, Hungary had shown interest but eventually did not bid.

Venue

The Championships were held at the Ergo Arena, opened in 2010, on the border of the cities of Sopot and Gdańsk. For the Championships it  seated 11,000.

For the competition a six-lane, banked 200-metre oval, with a blue surface, was installed on the arena floor, with an eight-lane straight-away track in the center for the 60-metre sprints and hurdles. The track officially opened on 16 February and almost 6000 people came to the ERGO Arena to mark its inauguration. The indoor portable banked track made by Mondo used the company's "Super X" rubberized surface (two layers, total 13.5 mm thick), which was used at both the 2008 and 2012 Summer Olympics. After the competition the track has been dismantled and moved permanently to the newly built indoor arena in Toruń.

American television coverage
The IAAF again chose not to get wide coverage in the large United States market.  Instead they sold exclusive rights to Universal Sports, a network associated with NBC Sports. Universal Sports can only be seen in about ten percent of the households in the American market.  Universal Sports limited other distribution of the content, even online content requiring login with cable subscription user names. For those viewers without access to Universal Sports, nationwide coverage of the entire meet was blacked out.  IAAF supported the blackout of coverage.  Unlike previous World Championship meetings, IAAF's YouTube channel provided only post race interviews and no coverage of the actual events at the meet.

Schedule

All dates are CET (UTC+1)

Medal summary

Men

Note: * = Relay athletes who only ran in heats

Women

Note: * = Relay athletes who only ran in heats

Medal table

Disqualifications

A number of athletes were disqualified for stepping over the inside track boundary and onto the in-field. The most high profile of these disqualifications was Poland's Marcin Lewandowski in the men's 800 m final. The host nation athlete originally won the bronze medal but a single step on the in-field led to his disqualification and the promotion of Great Britain's Andrew Osagie into the third podium position.

There was a similar occurrence in the women's 1500 m final, where Rababe Arafi took the bronze and she also received the honour in a medal ceremony. Half an hour afterwards, a review of race footage led to her being disqualified with Canada's Nicole Sifuentes being promoted to bronze position. Nick Willis, the original men's 1500 m fourth placer, was another high-profile disqualification.

Outside of the in-field track infringements, there were a smaller number of disqualifications. Reflecting the more physical nature of indoor competition, Richard Buck, Lisanne de Witte and Ioan Zaizan were all disqualified for obstruction or jostling. Siologa Viliamu Sepa and Musaeb Abdulrahman Balla were removed for lane infringement, while Michael Herreros' performance was erased due to improper hurdling. No athletes fell foul of the false start rule.

Doping

The Russian women's 4×400 m relay team was disqualified after Kseniya Ryzhovas doping sample from 7 March was found positive for trimetazidine.
Nataliia Lupu (UKR) was disqualified from the Women's 800 meters after her doping sample was found positive for Methylhexaneamine.
The Romanian shot putter Anca Heltne took part in the championships but was disqualified from all her results after a doping control carried out on 7 February 2014 showed she'd been using the anabolic steroids Dianabol and Oral Turinabol.

Records
One championship record was broken at the competition: the American men's 4×400 metres relay team ran a time of 3:02.13 minutes, which was also a world indoor record for the event (a time of 3:01.96 minutes was set by an American team in 2006 but this was not ratified due to a lack of a post-race EPO drug test). Six area (continental) indoor records were broken at the competition, as well as two men's heptathlon championship bests and numerous indoor national records in athletics.

Participating nations

 (1)
 (1)
 (1)
 (1)
 (1)
 (1)
 (1)
 (1)
 (3)
 (2)
 (1)
 (11)
 (2)
 (8)
 (4)
 (1)
 (1)
 (7)
 (1)
 (2)
 (9)
 (1)
 (12)
 (1)
 (1)
 (1)
 (1)
 (1)
 (3)
 (6)
 (1)
 (8)
 (2)
 (2)
 (1)
 (3)
 (1)
 (1)
 (2)
 (9)
 (3)
 (7)
 (1)
 (1)
 (1)
 (20)
 (1)
 (1)
 (32)
 (5)
 (1)
 (1)
 (2)
 (1)
 (1)
 (1)
 (2)
 (2)
 (2)
 (1)
 (5)
 (1)
 (12)
 (1)
 (22)
 (5)
 (4)
 (7)
 (1)
 (1)
 (1)
 (1)
 (1)
 (1)
 (1)
 (1)
 (1)
 (1)
 (1)
 (1)
 (1)
 (1)
 (1)
 (1)
 (6)
 (1)
 (12)
 (5)
 (1)
 (11)
 (1)
 (1)
 (1)
 (1)
 (1)
 (2)
 (1)
 (1)
 (1)
 (35)
 (3)
 (1)
 (4)
 (8)
 (36)
 (2)
 (1)
 (1)
 (1)
 (1)
 (1)
 (2)
 (1)
 (1)
 (2)
 (4)
 (1)
 (6)
 (11)
 (1)
 (1)
 (7)
 (1)
 (1)
 (3)
 (19)
 (2)
 (48)
 (2)
 (1)
 (2)
 (1)
 (2)

References

External links

Official site
IAAF Entry Standards (PDF)

 
2014
2014 in athletics (track and field)
2014 in Polish sport
Sport in Sopot
2014
March 2014 sports events in Europe